Indotyphlops madgemintonae is a species of blind snake in the family Typhlopidae. The species is endemic to Pakistan. Not further Study available about this species. Because their number is almost non-existent and their picture has not been recorded yet۔

Subspecies
Two subspecies are recognized as being valid, including the nominotypical subspecies.
Indotyphlops madgemintonae madgemintonae 
Indotyphlops madgemintonae shermani 

Nota bene: A trinomial authority in parentheses indicates that the subspecies was originally described in a genus other than Indotyphlops.

Etymology
The specific name, madgemintonae (genitive, feminine, singular), is in honor of Madge Alice Shortridge Rutherford Minton (1920–2004), the wife of American herpetologist Sherman A. Minton. The subspecific name, shermani (genitive, masculine, singular), is in honor of Sherman A. Minton.

Geographic range
I. madgemintonae is found in the Kashmir region of Pakistan.

References

Further reading
Hedges SB, Marion AB, Lipp KM, Marin J, Vidal N (2014). "A taxonomic framework for typhlopid snakes from the Caribbean and other regions (Reptilia, Squamata)". Caribbean Herpetology (49): 1-61. (Indotyphlops madgemintonae, new combination).
Khan MS (1999). "Two new species and a subspecies of blind snakes of genus Typhlops from Azad Kashmir and Punjab, Pakistan (Serpentes: Typhlopidae)". Russian Journal of Herpetology 6 (3): 231-240. ("Typhlops madgemintonai [sic]", new species, p. 233; "Typhlops madgemintonai shermanai [sic]", new subspecies, p. 236).
Wallach V (2000). "Critical review of some recent descriptions of Pakistani Typhlops by M. S. Khan, 1999 (Serpentes: Typhlopidae)". Hamadryad 25 (2): 129-143. (Typhlops madgemintonae, corrected name, p. 130).

madgemintonai
Reptiles described in 1999